Kinn or KINN may refer to:

Places
Kinn, a municipality in Vestland, Norway, established on 1 Jan 2020
Kinn (former municipality), a former municipality in Sogn og Fjordane county, Norway (1838-1964)
Kinn (island), an island in Vestland, Norway
Kinn Church, a church in Vestland, Norway

People
Gustav Kinn (1895–1978), a Swedish long-distance runner

Other
KINN, an American radio station
Kinn Bryggeri, a brewery in Florø, Norway